Monetary overhang is a phenomenon in which people have money holdings because of a lack of ability to spend them. This is a phenomenon often present with repressed inflation and was common in centrally planned economies like the Soviet Union.

The Soviet Union experienced monetary overhang from the mid-1980s onwards. This was reported by the IMF in 1991. Subsequent to this report, the USSR collapsed.

References

Inflation